Flight plan is the plan for a flight filed with aviation authorities.

Flight plan may also refer to:
 Flightplan, 2005 thriller film starring Jodie Foster
 Flight planning, planning a flight plan
 Flight-Plan, Japanese video game developer
 Flight Plan (film), a 1950 Australian documentary

See also
 Flight progress strip
 Flight traffic mapping
 Flightpath (disambiguation)